"Attitude Adjustment" is a song written and recorded by American singer-songwriter and musician Hank Williams Jr. It was released in June 1984 as the first single from the album Major Moves.  The song reached number 5 on the Billboard Hot Country Singles & Tracks chart.

Chart performance

References

1984 singles
Hank Williams Jr. songs
Songs written by Hank Williams Jr.
Song recordings produced by Jimmy Bowen
Warner Records singles
Curb Records singles
1984 songs